Łubowo  is a village in Gniezno County, Greater Poland Voivodeship, in west-central Poland. It is the seat of the gmina (administrative district) called Gmina Łubowo.

The village has a population of 951.

References

Villages in Gniezno County